Lieutenant-Colonel Ferdinando Wallis Bennet (13 December 1850 – 17 October 1929) was an English soldier who played in four first-class cricket matches between 1874 and 1878.

Bennet was born at Tresillian House near St Newlyn East in Cornwall in 1850. He went to Sherborne School before attending the Royal Military Academy, Sandhurst. He was commissioned in the Royal Engineers, rising to the rank of Lieutenant-Colonel, brevetted to Colonel, at the end of his military career. As a Lieutenant he was British Vice-Consul of Anatolia based in Adana between 1880 and 1882.

Bennet played in four first-class cricket matches between 1874 and 1878. He played three matches in 1874, once for each of Kent County Cricket Club, Gentlemen of the South and a side representing Kent and Gloucestershire. In 1878 he made one appearance for MCC.

Bennet married Evelyn Palmer and was a JP in Devon in later life. He died in Northam, Devon in 1929 aged 78.

References

External links

 

1850 births
1929 deaths
English cricketers
Kent cricketers
People from Newlyn
Marylebone Cricket Club cricketers
Gentlemen of the South cricketers